Calphostin C is a natural chemical compound. It is one of the calphostins, isolated from the fungus Cladosporium cladosporioides.  Calphostin C is a potent inhibitor of protein kinase C (PKC).

References

External links 

O-methylated natural phenols
Cladosporium
Protein kinase inhibitors
Benzoate esters
3-Hydroxypropenals within hydroxyquinones